Yuliya Karimova (born  in Kemerovo, Russia) is a Russian-born Azerbaijani volleyball player that plays for Azerrail Baku and Azerbaijan women's national volleyball team as a libero.

Clubs
  Azerrail Baku (2014-2015)
  Azeryol Baku (2015-2017)
  Absheron VC (2017-2018)
  Almaty VC (2018-2019)
  Maccabi Haifa (2019-2020)
  Azerrail Baku (2020-present)

External links 
FIVB profile
Volleybox profile

References

1988 births
Living people
Sportspeople from Kemerovo
Russian women's volleyball players
Azerbaijani women's volleyball players
Russian emigrants to Azerbaijan
Naturalized citizens of Azerbaijan
Liberos